Montagu Butler may refer to:
Henry Montagu Butler (1833–1918), British academic and clergyman, Master of Trinity College, Cambridge
Edward Montagu Butler (1866–1948, English first-class cricketer and schoolmaster (son of Henry Montagu Butler)
Arthur Hugh Montagu Butler (1873–1943), House of Lords Librarian (son of Henry Montagu Butler)
Sir James Ramsay Montagu Butler (1889–1975), British politician and academic (son of Henry Montagu Butler)
Sir Nevile Montagu Butler (1893–1973), British diplomat (son of Henry Montagu Butler)
Montagu Sherard Dawes Butler (1873–1952), British academic and colonial administrator, Master of Pembroke College, Cambridge
Montagu C. Butler (1884–1970), British academic, lexicographer, musician, and Esperantist
Montagu C. Butler Library, Esperanto library at Wedgwood Memorial College